Mehdi Abid Charef (born 14 December 1980 in Constantine) is an Algerian association football referee.

He also participated at the 2015 FIFA U-17 World Cup in Chile and the 2017 FIFA U-17 World Cup in India

International Matches
2015 Africa Cup of Nations in Equatorial Guinea
Ivory Coast vs Guinea (group stage).
2015 FIFA U-17 World Cup in Chile
Germany vs Australia (group stage)
France vs Paraguay (group stage)
2016 African Nations Championship (CHAN) in Rwanda
Mali vs Uganda (group stage)
2017 Africa Cup of Nations in Gabon
Ghana vs Mali (group stage)
Ghana vs Burkina Faso (Match for third place)
2017 FIFA U-17 World Cup in India
Germany vs Costa Rica (group stage)
Honduras vs New Caldedonia (group stage)
Mali vs Ghana (quarter final)
2018 African Nations Championship (CHAN) in Morocco
Zambia vs Uganda (group stage)
Sudan vs Libya (Match for third place)

References

External links
Mehdi Abid Charef, WorldReferee.com

Living people
1980 births
Algerian football referees
People from Constantine, Algeria
2018 FIFA World Cup referees
21st-century Algerian people